Derrick Lanorris Sharp (born October 5, 1971) is an American-Israeli retired professional basketball player and coach.

He played with the Maccabi Tel Aviv basketball club for 15 years, spending part of the time as the team's captain, and also later served as the team's assistant coach under David Blatt. With Maccabi, he won a record 29 club titles. In July 2011, Sharp retired from playing professional basketball. After he retired from playing, he remained with Maccabi Tel Aviv, working as an assistant coach with the club, until August 2013.

High school
Sharp, who was born in Orlando, Florida, attended Evans High School, in Orlando. At Evans High, he played high school basketball.

College career
After high school, Sharp played college basketball at Brevard Community College, from 1989 to 1991. He then played college basketball at the University of South Florida, where he played with the South Florida Bulls, from 1991 to 1993.

Professional playing career
Sharp joined Maccabi Hadera, which was playing in the Israeli 2nd Division at the time, for the 1993–94 season. From 1994 to 1996, he played with Hapoel Migdal-HaEmek, which competed in the Israeli 2nd Division in the 1994–95 season, and in the Israeli 3rd Division, in the 1995–96 season. Sharp then made the big jump in his career, when he moved to the most well-known team in Israel – Maccabi Tel Aviv.

With Maccabi Tel Aviv, Sharp won 13 Israeli national league championships, 11 Israeli State Cups, 2 Israeli League Cups, and 3 European-wide titles (the 2001 FIBA SuproLeague, the 2004 EuroLeague, and the 2005 EuroLeague). As a member of Maccabi Tel Aviv, Sharp quickly became a crowd favorite, due to his tough defense, three-point shooting, and clutch plays. The most memorable example of the latter came on April 8, 2004, in a EuroLeague game against the Lithuanian club Zalgiris Kaunas. With 2 seconds remaining in the game, and Maccabi Tel Aviv trailing by 3 points and facing elimination from the EuroLeague Top 16 phase, Sharp caught a long pass from Gur Shelef, turned to the basket, and fired up a game-tying three-pointer, forcing overtime. Maccabi Tel Aviv won that game, and advanced to the EuroLeague Final Four, which was held in Tel Aviv that year. The team eventually became the EuroLeague champions.

In July 2011, Sharp retired from playing professional basketball, at the age of 39. In total, Sharp played professional basketball in Israel for 18 years, spending 15 of them with Maccabi Tel Aviv. Sharp finished his playing career ranked seventh all-time on Maccabi Tel Aviv's career scoring list in European-wide games. In the EuroLeague, he scored a total of 1,755 points, in 290 games played, for a career scoring average of 6.1 points per game, when including both the FIBA and EuroLeague Basketball eras of the competition. At the time of his retirement, he was ranked seventh in the EuroLeague's modern era (since 2000), in career free throw accuracy, at 88.9%.

National team playing career
Sharp became a naturalized Israeli citizen. He then played with the senior Israeli national team, from 2000 to 2003. With Israel, he played at the 2001 EuroBasket and at the 2003 EuroBasket.

Coaching career
After he retired from playing professional basketball, Sharp continued to work with Maccabi Tel Aviv as an assistant coach, after he had taken a coaching course at Wingate Institute, in 2010. On August 2, 2013, Sharp resigned from his role as an assistant coach of Maccabi Tel-Aviv.

Personal life
In the mid-1990s, Sharp married an Israeli woman, and thus received Israeli citizenship, by virtue of that marriage. The couple have one son, who also played basketball in Israel. In 1999, he divorced his first wife, and married Canadian basketball player Justine Ellison. They have four children together, three sons and a daughter.

Sharp lived with his family in Herzliya, Israel, until August 2013, when they moved to Orlando, Florida. His son from his first marriage later returned to Israel to pursue a basketball playing career. Sharp later moved to Tampa, Florida, where he formally worked as the head coach of the Blake High School boys' basketball team. Sharp is currently the Varsity Boys' Head Basketball Coach at Bishop McLaughlin Catholic High School in Pasco County, Florida.

Honors and awards 
 Maccabi Tel Aviv:
 13× Israeli League Champion: (1997–2007, 2009, 2011)
 11× Israeli State Cup Winner: (1998–2006, 2010, 2011)
 FIBA SuproLeague Champion: (2001)
 3× Triple Crown Winner: (2001, 2004, 2005)
 2× EuroLeague Champion: (2004, 2005)
 2× Israeli League Cup Winner: (2007, 2010)

References

External links

 EuroLeague profile
 FIBA Archive profile
 FIBA Europe profile
 Israeli League profile

1971 births
Living people
ABA League players
African-American basketball players
American emigrants to Israel
American expatriate basketball people in Israel
American men's basketball players
American people of Israeli descent
Basketball players from Orlando, Florida
Eastern Florida State College people
Israeli basketball coaches
Israeli men's basketball players
Israeli Basketball Premier League players
Israeli people of African-American descent
Junior college men's basketball players in the United States
Hapoel Migdal HaEmek B.C. players
Maccabi Tel Aviv B.C. players
Naturalized citizens of Israel
Point guards
Shooting guards
South Florida Bulls men's basketball players
Wingate Institute alumni
21st-century African-American sportspeople
20th-century African-American sportspeople